This article is a list of châteaux in Nord-Pas-de-Calais, France.

Nord

Arrondissement of Avesnes-sur-Helpe 
Château de Potelle in Potelle
Château de Rametz in Saint-Waast-la-Vallée
Château de Trélon in Trélon
Château d'Audignies in Audignies

Arrondissement of Cambrai
Château d'Esnes in Esnes
Château de la Motte Fénelon in Cambrai
Château de Rieux in Rieux-en-Cambrésis

Arrondissement of Douai
Château des Frenelles in Bouvignies
Château de Bernicourt in Roost-Warendin
Château de Gœulzin in Gœulzin
Château de Montmonrency in Montigny-en-Ostrevent
Château de Roucourt in Roucourt

Arrondissement of Dunkerque 
Château d'Esquelbecq in Esquelbecq
Château de Gravelines in Gravelines
Château de Steene in Steene
Manoir du Withof in Bourbourg
Château de la Motte-aux-Bois in Morbecque

Arrondissement of Lille

Arrondissement of Valenciennes
Château d'Aubry du Hainaut in Aubry-du-Hainaut
Château de Bouchain in Bouchain
Château de l'Hermitage in Condé-sur-l'Escaut
Château de Bailleul in Condé-sur-l'Escaut
Château du Loir in Sars-et-Rosières
Château Desandrouin in Valenciennes

Pas-de-Calais

Arrondissement of Arras 

Château de Barly in Barly
Donjon de Bours in Bours
Château de Couin in Couin
Château de Duisans in Duisans
Château de Grand-Rullecourt in Grand-Rullecourt
Château de Pas-en-Artois in Pas-en-Artois
Château de Tramecourt in Tramecourt
Château de Villers-Châtel in Villers-Châtel
Château de Saulty in Saulty
Château de Hendecourt in Hendecourt-les-Cagnicourt

Arrondissement of Béthune 

Château de Beaulieu in Busnes
Château de Quesnoy in Busnes
Château de La Buissière in Bruay-la-Buissière
Château de Créminil in Estrée-Blanche
Château de Liettres in Liettres
Château d'Olhain in Fresnicourt-le-Dolmen
Manoir de la Besvre in Witternesse

Arrondissement of Boulogne-sur-Mer 
Fort Mahon in Ambleteuse
Château de Boulogne-sur-Mer in Boulogne-sur-Mer
Château d'Hardelot in Neufchâtel-Hardelot
Château de Pont-de-Briques in Saint-Léonard
Château d'Hesdin-l'Abbé or Hôtel Cléry in Hesdin-l'Abbé
Château de Recq in Recques-sur-Course by the architect Giraud Sannier

Arrondissement of Calais 
Citadelle de Calais in Calais
Fort Risban in Calais
Château de la Bien-Assise in Guînes

Arrondissement of Montreuil 
Château royal-citadelle in Montreuil
Château de Rosamel in Frencq
Château du Valivon in Campagne les Hesdin

Arrondissement of Saint-Omer
Château de Clarques in Clarques
Château de Cocove in Recques-sur-Hem
Château de Laprée in Quiestède
Château de Draëck in Zutkerque

See also

 List of castles in France

References 

 Centre
Châteaux in Hauts-de-France